Tennis tournament in Chile is divided into 3 categories,
Futures tournaments, ATP Challenger Series, ATP 250 Series.These tournaments are played 
on clay and consist of 9 tournaments played on the year in the cities of Antofagasta, Concepción, Iquique, Viña del Mar and Santiago.	
Of all tournaments played, the most important is the Movistar Open.

Tournament

By Category

Tournament

Former Tournament

References

External links
Federacion de Tenis de Chile
Movista Open
Iquique Open
Providencia Open